North Gosforth Academy is a co-educational secondary school located in Seaton Burn, Tyne and Wear, England. It has a specialism in business and enterprise. In 2018 it became a member of Gosforth Federated Academies.

North Gosforth Academy offers GCSEs, BTECs and Cambridge Nationals as programmes of study for pupils.

History 

In 2017 it was announced that Seaton Burn College was to be sponsored by Gosforth Academy. Until 1 January 2018 the school was known as Seaton Burn College and was a foundation school administered by North Tyneside Metropolitan Borough Council.

Notable staff
 John Graham, cricketer

Notable former pupils 
 Robson Green, actor
 Andy Sinton, former England International Football player

References

External links 
North Gosforth Academy official website

Secondary schools in the Metropolitan Borough of North Tyneside
Academies in the Metropolitan Borough of North Tyneside